Darkwing may refer to:
Darkwing (novel), a novel by Kenneth Oppel
The Dark Wing, a 2001 science fiction novel by Walter H. Hunt
Darkwing Duck, Disney cartoon character
Darkwing, a fictional bat monster associated with Kamen Rider Knight